Eddio Victorino Inostroza Ibacache (born 3 September 1946) is a Chilean former footballer and manager.

He worked as Colo-Colo assistant coach between 1986 and 1991 being present in the charge during 1991 Copa Libertadores title obtention with Mirko Jozić in the bench. Then in 1994 he served as caretaker coach after Vicente Cantatore demission, having a prior experience at Deportes La Serena two years ago.

Honours

Club
Huachipato
 Primera División de Chile: 1974

Unión Española
 Primera División de Chile: 1975

Colo-Colo
 Primera División de Chile (3):  1979, 1981, 1982
 Copa Chile (2): 1981, 1982

References

1946 births
Chilean footballers
C.D. Huachipato footballers
Unión Española footballers
Colo-Colo footballers
Deportes Temuco footballers
Chilean football managers
Chilean Primera División managers
Deportes La Serena managers
Colo-Colo managers
Living people

Association football midfielders